Mount Wheeler, is a  mountain summit located in Glacier National Park of British Columbia, Canada. It is the third-highest peak in the park, and sixth-highest in the Selkirk Mountains range. 
Its nearest higher peak is Mount Selwyn,  to the north-northwest. Mount Wheeler is surrounded by ice, including the Deville Glacier, Deville Névé, Black Glacier, and Thor Glacier. Precipitation runoff from the mountain and meltwater from its glaciers drains into tributaries of the Incomappleux and Beaver Rivers.

History

The first ascent of the mountain was made in 1902 by Arthur Oliver Wheeler and Fredrich Michel. Mount Wheeler was named in 1904 for Arthur Oliver Wheeler (1860-1945), a Dominion Land Surveyor who made the first ascent of the peak, and co-founder and first president of the Alpine Club of Canada. The mountain's name was officially adopted September 8, 1932, by the Geographical Names Board of Canada.

Climate
Based on the Köppen climate classification, Mount Wheeler is located in a subarctic climate zone with cold, snowy winters, and mild summers. Winter temperatures can drop below −20 °C with wind chill factors below −30 °C.

See also
Geography of British Columbia

References

External links
 Weather forecast: Mount Wheeler
 Mt. Wheeler aerial photo: PBase

Three-thousanders of British Columbia
Selkirk Mountains
Glacier National Park (Canada)